Will Griffiths (born 25 December 1998) is a Welsh rugby union player who plays for the Ospreys as a lock.

Griffiths made his debut for the Ospreys in 2018 having previously played for the Ospreys academy, Swansea RFC and the Ospreys Development. He made his Challenge Cup debut on 15 December 2018 against Stade Français.

References

External links 
Ospreys Player Profile

Welsh rugby union players
Ospreys (rugby union) players
Living people
1998 births
Rugby union locks